The Holy Cross Crusaders women's basketball team is the women's basketball team that represents the College of the Holy Cross in Worcester, Massachusetts. The team currently competes in the Patriot League. The Crusaders are currently coached by Maureen Magarity.

History
The Crusaders began play in 1974. They went 0–12, coached by Sharon Dupre in her only season.
For their first six years (1974–1980), the Crusaders were in Division III, going 37–60 during that time. From 1980 to 1982, the Crusaders were in Division II, going 43–8 during their two season tenure before making the jump to Division I. The Crusaders joined the Metro Atlantic Athletic Conference in 1983. In their seven season tenure, they won two conference tournaments. In 1990, the Crusaders joined the Patriot League. They have won the Patriot League women's basketball tournament 11 times, the most of any school in the League. The Crusaders are coached by Maureen Magarity.

Postseason

NCAA Women's Division I Basketball Championship
The Crusaders have appeared in the NCAA Women's Division I Basketball Championship 12 times. Their record is 1–12.

WNIT results
The Crusaders have appeared in the Women's National Invitation Tournament (WNIT) twice.

WBI results
The Crusaders have appeared in the Women's Basketball Invitational (WBI) once.

Player accolades

MAAC Player of the Year
 1985 – Janet Hourihan
 1987 – Tracy Quinn

Patriot League Player of the Year
 1991 – Mary Helen Walker
 1992 – Norinne Powers
 1993 – Norinne Powers
 1994 – Laurie Carson
 1995 – Lauren Maney
 1996 – Lauren Maney
 1997 – Kathy Courtney
 1998 – Amy O’Brien
 1999 – Amy O’Brien
 2000 – Anna Kinne
 2008 – Briana McFadden
 2021-22 – Avery Labarbra

Coaching history

Season-by-season results
Holy Cross played in the Metro Atlantic Athletic Conference (MAAC) 1983 to 1990 before joining the Patriot League in 1990.

References

External links